DXQA (98.5 FM), broadcasting as 98.5 Radyo Kidlat, is a radio station owned and operated by Siargao Electric Cooperative (SIARELCO). The station's studio and transmitter are located in Brgy. Catabaan, Dapa, Surigao del Norte.

References

Radio stations established in 2021
Radio stations in Surigao del Norte